Douglas Lima  (born 5 January 1988) is a Brazilian mixed martial artist who competes in the welterweight division of Bellator MMA, where he is a former three-time Bellator Welterweight Champion. He is also the former MFC Welterweight Champion. He is currently ranked the #3 Welterweight in the world by USA Today/MMAjunkie and the #6 Welterweight fighter in the world by MMA ranking site Fight Matrix, and he was widely regarded as the best MMA Welterweight fighter outside of the UFC in 2019. Lima and his brother Dhiego Lima own American Top Team - Team Lima in Duluth, Georgia.

As of July 26 2022, he is #4 in the Bellator Welterweight Rankings.

Mixed martial arts career

Early career
Lima was born in Brazil and moved to the state of Georgia in the United States graduating from Joseph Wheeler High School. He began training with American Top Team Atlanta. Son to Fausto and Cologera Lima. He trains with Roan Carneiro. Lima began his professional mixed martial arts career with decent success, soon compiling a record of 5–0.

In February 2007, Lima faced the future Ultimate Fighter competitor Matt Brown for the ISCF (International Sport Combat Federation) Pro East Coast Welterweight Title. Brown dealt Lima his first professional loss by defeating him via TKO due to punches in the second round.

American Fight League
In May 2008, Lima had his first defense of the title against Brent Weedman. Weedman was reportedly brought in to the fight to showcase Lima's skills, as Weedman was expected to be an easy fight. Weedman threatened early on with a triangle choke which was unsuccessful. Late in the second round, Weedman again caught Lima in a triangle choke, but transitioned to an armbar, which forced Lima to submit, giving Weedman the title. Weedman would later go on to say "They brought me in because Douglas Lima would make a great champ for them. Now, it's my turn to step up. I feel good about the fact that I did a one-fight deal with them. We're going to talk a multi-fight contract now." Following the loss, Lima never appeared for the AFL promotion again.

World Extreme Cagefighting
Following another win via TKO, Lima joined World Extreme Cagefighting. His debut fight was scheduled to take place at WEC 39 against Justin Haskins. However, Lima was forced to withdraw from the card while waiting on papers to arrive from the U.S. Bureau of Citizenship and Immigration Services. Lima's WEC debut never transpired, as instead, he joined King of the Cage, where he faced another future Ultimate Fighter competitor in Charles Blanchard, losing by unanimous decision.

Maximum Fighting Championship
In September 2010, Douglas Lima joined the Maximum Fighting Championship, facing off against Ryan Ford. In front of Ford's hometown fans, Lima was able to defeat Ford via armbar, early in the second round.

With the win, Lima was given an MFC Welterweight title shot against Jesse Juarez at MFC 27. Lima went on to defeat Juarez via armbar, midway through the final round.

Lima then defended the title against Terry Martin at MFC 29, winning the fight via first-round TKO.

Bellator Fighting Championships

2011
In May 2011, it was announced that Lima had signed to fight for Bellator Fighting Championships.

Lima entered into the Bellator Season 5 Welterweight Tournament. He fought Steve Carl in the opening round held at Bellator 49 and won the fight via unanimous decision. Lima fought Chris Lozano in the semifinals at Bellator 53 and won via KO in the second round. In the finals, he faced Ben Saunders and won via KO in the second round.

2012
Lima got his title shot against welterweight champion Ben Askren at Bellator 64 on April 6, 2012. He lost the fight via unanimous decision.

Lima defeated Jacob Ortiz via head kick and knee at 4:50 of the third round at Bellator 79 on November 2, 2012.

2013
Lima faced Russian MMA prospect Michail Tsarev in Season Eight Welterweight Tournament on January 24, 2013 at Bellator 86. He won the fight via TKO due to leg strikes in round 2.  In the semi-finals, he was scheduled to face Brent Weedman. Weedman suffered an injury and was replaced by Bryan Baker at Bellator 90 on February 21, 2013.  He won the fight via knock out in the first round. He was expected to face Ben Saunders in a rematch in the tournament final at Bellator 93. Lima suffered a broken hand.

The rematch with Saunders eventually took place at Bellator 100 on September 20, 2013. Lima once again won in the second round, this time via a brutal head kick knockout.

2014
Lima faced judo olympian Rick Hawn at Bellator 117 on April 18, 2014. After several knockdowns due to leg kicks, Lima won via TKO due to corner stoppage to win the vacant Bellator Welterweight Championship.

2015
Lima was scheduled to make his first title defense against Paul Daley on February 27, 2015 at Bellator 134. However, in January, it was announced that Lima had pulled out of the fight due to injury. Lima was replaced by fellow Brazilian André Santos.

After 15 months away from the sport due to knee injuries, Lima returned to defend his title against Bellator Season Ten Welterweight tournament winner Andrey Koreshkov at Bellator 140 on July 17, 2015. He lost the fight and title by  unanimous decision.

2016
After nearly a year away from the sport, Lima returned to the Bellator cage to replace Josh Koscheck against Paul Daley at Bellator 158 on July 16, 2016. He won the fight via unanimous decision.

The win over Daley earned Lima a rematch against Bellator Welterweight Champion Andrey Koreshkov.  The two met in the main event at Bellator 164 on November 10, 2016. Lima regained his title by winning by knockout in the third round.

2017
For the first defense of his second title reign, Lima faced Lorenz Larkin at Bellator NYC on June 24, 2017. He won the fight via a unanimous decision (50–45, 48–47, and 48–47) to retain the Bellator welterweight championship.

On September 6, 2017 Lima announced that he had signed a six-fight, two-year contract with Bellator.

2018
For the second defense of his title, Lima faced Rory MacDonald at Bellator 192 on January 20, 2018. He lost the back-and-forth fight by unanimous decision.

Lima faced Andrey Koreshkov in a third match as part of the opening round of the Bellator Welterweight World Grand Prix on September 29, 2018 at Bellator 206. He won the fight via a rear-naked choke in the fifth round.

2019
In the tournament semifinals, Lima faced the undefeated Michael Page in the co-main event at Bellator 221 on May 11, 2019. Lima won the fight via knockout in round two.

In the Bellator Welterweight World Grand Prix final, Lima challenged Rory MacDonald in a rematch for the welterweight title at Bellator 232 on October 26, 2019. He won the fight by unanimous decision to become a three-time Bellator welterweight champion and the 2019 Welterweight Grand Prix winner, receiving the $1,000,000 prize.

2020
As the first fight of his new, multi-year contract, Lima was scheduled to face Gegard Mousasi for the vacant Bellator Middleweight World Championship at Bellator 242 on May 9, 2020. However, it was later announced that Bellator 242 and Lima's fight against Mousasi were being postponed due to the COVID-19 pandemic. Instead, Lima faced Mousasi on October 29 at Bellator 250. Lima lost the fight via unanimous decision.

2021
In the first defense of his title in his third reign as Bellator Welterweight World Champion, Lima faced undefeated Yaroslav Amosov at Bellator 260 on June 11, 2021. He lost the bout by unanimous decision.

Lima faced Michael Page in a rematch on October 1, 2021 at Bellator 267. He lost the bout via split decision. 6 out of 7 media outlets scored the bout as a win for Lima.

2022 
Lima was scheduled to face Jason Jackson on May 13, 2022 at Bellator 281. However, due to unknown reasons, the bout was pulled from the event and was rescheduled for July 22, 2022 at Bellator 283. After the main event was scrapped and the reshuffling of the bouts, Lima vs. Jackson was upgraded to the main event and 5 rounds. At the weigh-ins, Douglas Lima, came in at 172.8 lbs, 1.8 pounds heavy for his headlining welterweight bout. The bout proceeded at a catchweight and Lima was fined a percentage of his individual purse, which went to Jackson. Lima lost the bout via unanimous decision, getting controlled on the ground for 5 rounds.

Moving up to Middleweight once again, Lima is scheduled to face Costello van Steenis on May 12, 2023 at Bellator 296.

Championships and accomplishments
Bellator Fighting Championships
Bellator Welterweight World Championship (Three times)
One successful title defense (second reign)
Bellator Season 8 Welterweight Tournament Winner
Bellator Season 5 Welterweight Tournament Winner
Bellator Welterweight World Grand Prix Winner
 Tied (with Patricky Freire) for second most knockouts in Bellator history (nine)
 Second most wins in Bellator welterweight division history (13)
 Tied (with Michael Page) for most stoppage victories in Bellator welterweight division history (nine)
 Tied (with Michael Page and Andrey Koreshkov) for most knockout victories in Bellator welterweight division history (eight)
 Second most fights in Bellator Welterweight division history (18)
Maximum Fighting Championship
MFC Welterweight Championship (One time)
Knockout of the Night (One time)
Submission of the Night (Two times)
Sin City Fight Club/SportFight X
2010 REDLINE Middleweight Grand Prix Champion
Sherdog
2014 All-Violence Third Team
MMAJunkie.com
2019 May Knockout of the Month vs. Michael Page

Mixed martial arts record

|-
|Loss
|align=center|32–11
|Jason Jackson
|Decision (unanimous)
|Bellator 283
|
|align=center|5
|align=center|5:00
|Tacoma, Washington, United States
|
|-
|Loss
|align=center|32–10 
|Michael Page 
|Decision (split)
|Bellator 267
|
|align=center|3
|align=center|5:00
|London, England
|
|-
|Loss
|align=center|32–9
|Yaroslav Amosov 
|Decision (unanimous)
|Bellator 260
|
|align=center|5
|align=center|5:00
|Uncasville, Connecticut, United States
|
|-
|Loss
|align=center|32–8
|Gegard Mousasi
|Decision (unanimous)
|Bellator 250
|
|align=center|5
|align=center|5:00
|Uncasville, Connecticut, United States
|
|-
|Win
|align=center|32–7
|Rory MacDonald 
|Decision (unanimous)
|Bellator 232
|
|align=center|5
|align=center|5:00
|Uncasville, Connecticut, United States
|
|-
|Win
|align=center|31–7
|Michael Page
|KO (punches)
|Bellator 221
|
|align=center|2
|align=center|0:35
||Rosemont, Illinois, United States
|
|-
|-
|Win
|align=center|30–7
|Andrey Koreshkov
|Technical Submission (rear-naked choke)
|Bellator 206
|
|align=center|5
|align=center|3:04
|San Jose, California, United States
|
|-
|Loss
|align=center|29–7
|Rory MacDonald
|Decision (unanimous)
|Bellator 192
|
|align=center|5
|align=center|5:00
|Inglewood, California, United States
|
|-
|Win
|align=center|29–6
|Lorenz Larkin
|Decision (unanimous)
|Bellator NYC
|
|align=center|5
|align=center|5:00
|New York City, New York, United States
|
|-
| Win
| align=center| 28–6
| Andrey Koreshkov
| KO (punches)
| Bellator 164
| 
| align=center| 3
| align=center| 1:21
| Tel Aviv, Israel
| 
|-
| Win
| align=center| 27–6
| Paul Daley
| Decision (unanimous)
| Bellator 158
| 
| align=center| 3
| align=center| 5:00
| London, England, United Kingdom
| 
|-
| Loss
| align=center| 26–6
| Andrey Koreshkov
| Decision (unanimous)
| Bellator 140
| 
| align=center| 5
| align=center| 5:00
| Uncasville, Connecticut, United States
| 
|-
| Win
| align=center| 26–5
| Rick Hawn
| TKO (corner stoppage)
| Bellator 117
| 
| align=center| 2
| align=center| 3:19
| Council Bluffs, Iowa, United States
| 
|-
| Win
| align=center| 25–5
| Ben Saunders
| KO (head kick)
| Bellator 100
| 
| align=center| 2
| align=center| 4:33
| Phoenix, Arizona, United States
| 
|-
| Win
| align=center| 24–5
| Bryan Baker
| KO (punch)
| Bellator 90
| 
| align=center| 1
| align=center| 2:34
| West Valley City, Utah, United States
| 
|-
| Win
| align=center| 23–5
| Michail Tsarev
| TKO (leg kicks)
| Bellator 86
| 
| align=center| 2
| align=center| 1:44
| Thackerville, Oklahoma, United States
| 
|-
| Win
| align=center| 22–5
| Jacob Ortiz
| TKO (head kick and knee)
| Bellator 79
| 
| align=center| 3
| align=center| 4:50
| Rama, Ontario, Canada
| 
|-
| Loss
| align=center| 21–5
| Ben Askren
| Decision (unanimous)
| Bellator 64
| 
| align=center| 5
| align=center| 5:00
| Windsor, Ontario, Canada
| 
|-
| Win
| align=center| 21–4
| Ben Saunders
| KO (punches)
| Bellator 57
| 
| align=center| 2
| align=center| 1:21
| Rama, Ontario, Canada
| 
|-
| Win
| align=center| 20–4
| Chris Lozano
| KO (punch)
| Bellator 53
| 
| align=center| 2
| align=center| 3:14
| Miami, Oklahoma, United States
| 
|-
| Win
| align=center| 19–4
| Steve Carl
| Decision (unanimous)
| Bellator 49
| 
| align=center| 3
| align=center| 5:00
| Atlantic City, New Jersey United States
| 
|-
| Win
| align=center| 18–4
| Terry Martin
| TKO (punches)
| MFC 29: Conquer
| 
| align=center| 1
| align=center| 1:14
| Windsor, Ontario, Canada
| 
|-
| Win
| align=center| 17–4
| Jesse Juarez
| Submission (triangle armbar)
| MFC 27
| 
| align=center| 3
| align=center| 2:37
| Edmonton, Alberta, Canada
| 
|-
| Win
| align=center| 16–4
| Ryan Ford
| Submission (armbar)
| MFC 26
| 
| align=center| 2
| align=center| 0:48
| Edmonton, Alberta, Canada
| 
|-
| Win
| align=center| 15–4
| Cortez Coleman
| Decision (split)
| SportFight X-1: Beatdown
| 
| align=center| 3
| align=center| 5:00
| Atlanta, Georgia, United States
| 
|-
| Win
| align=center| 14–4
| Clint Hester
| Decision (unanimous)
| Sin City Fight Club: Redline Grand Prix Round 2
| 
| align=center| 3
| align=center| 5:00
| Atlanta, Georgia, United States
| 
|-
| Win
| align=center| 13–4
| Eddie Hernandez
| Submission (triangle choke)
| Sin City Fight Club: Redline Grand Prix Opening Round
| 
| align=center| 1
| align=center| 2:34
| Atlanta, Georgia, United States
| 
|-
| Loss
| align=center| 12–4
| Eric Dahlberg
| Decision (unanimous)
| Best of the Best
| 
| align=center| 3
| align=center| 5:00
| Columbus, Georgia, United States
| 
|-
| Loss
| align=center| 12–3
| Charles Blanchard
| Decision (unanimous)
| KOTC: Invincible
| 
| align=center| 3
| align=center| 5:00
| Atlanta, Georgia, United States
| 
|-
| Win
| align=center| 12–2
| Joseph Baize
| TKO (punches) 
| Southern Kentucky: Combat League
| 
| align=center| 1
| align=center| 2:30
| Owensboro, Kentucky, United States
| 
|-
| Loss
| align=center| 11–2
| Brent Weedman
| Submission (armbar)
| AFL: Bulletproof
| 
| align=center| 2
| align=center| 4:39
| Atlanta, Georgia, United States
| 
|-
| Win
| align=center| 11–1
| Cody Senseney
| TKO (punches)
| AFL: Eruption
| 
| align=center| 1
| align=center| 2:45
| Lexington, Kentucky, United States
| 
|-
| Win
| align=center| 10–1
| Eric Davila
| Submission (armbar)
| ROF 31: Undisputed
| 
| align=center| 2
| align=center| 3:52
| Broomfield, Colorado, United States
| 
|-
| Win
| align=center| 9–1
| Daniel Douglas
| Submission (rear-naked choke)
| RMBB & PCF 1: HellRazor
| 
| align=center| 1
| align=center| 0:28
| Denver, Colorado, United States
| 
|-
| Win
| align=center| 8–1
| Kyle Baker
| Submission (triangle armbar)
| Reign in the Cage
| 
| align=center| 1
| align=center| 4:45
| Alabama, United States
| 
|-
| Win
| align=center| 7–1
| Ed Nuno
| TKO (injury)
| XFS 6: Bad Blood
| 
| align=center| 1
| align=center| 0:28
| Boise, Idaho, United States
| 
|-
| Win
| align=center| 6–1
| Joshua Hancock
| TKO 
| Evolution: Mayhem in Albany
| 
| align=center| 1
| align=center| N/A
| Albany, Georgia, United States
| 
|-
| Loss
| align=center| 5–1
| Matt Brown
| TKO (punches)
| ISCF: Invasion
| 
| align=center| 2
| align=center| 2:50
| Kennesaw, Georgia, United States
| 
|-
| Win
| align=center| 5–0
| Ray Perales
| TKO (submission to punches)
| Xtreme Fight Series 3
| 
| align=center| 1
| align=center| 3:07
| Boise, Idaho, United States
| 
|-
| Win
| align=center| 4–0
| John Nellermoe
| Submission (triangle choke)
| ISCF: Southside Slugfest
| 
| align=center| 1
| align=center| 1:07
| Peachtree City, Georgia, United States
| 
|-
| Win
| align=center| 3–0
| Nathan Osterkamp
| Submission (rear-naked choke)
| Border Warz
| 
| align=center| 1
| align=center| 1:57
| Colorado Springs, Colorado, United States
| 
|-
| Win
| align=center| 2–0
| Steve Linton
| Submission (verbal) 
| ISCF: Fever Fight Night
| 
| align=center| 1
| align=center| N/A
| Atlanta, Georgia, United States
| 
|-
| Win
| align=center| 1–0
| Carlos Julio Molestina
| KO (punches)
| Wild Bill's: Fight Night 3
| 
| align=center| 1
| align=center| 1:08
| Duluth, Georgia, United States
|

See also
 List of current Bellator fighters
 List of current mixed martial arts champions
 List of male mixed martial artists

References

External links
 
 
 

1988 births
Living people
Brazilian male mixed martial artists
Welterweight mixed martial artists
Mixed martial artists utilizing Muay Thai
Mixed martial artists utilizing Brazilian jiu-jitsu
Bellator MMA champions
Bellator male fighters
Sportspeople from Goiânia
Brazilian practitioners of Brazilian jiu-jitsu
People awarded a black belt in Brazilian jiu-jitsu
Brazilian Muay Thai practitioners
Brazilian emigrants to the United States